Progress 16 was a Soviet uncrewed Progress cargo spacecraft, which was launched in October 1982 to resupply the Salyut 7 space station.

Spacecraft
Progress 16 was a Progress 7K-TG spacecraft. The 16th of forty three to be launched, it had the serial number 115. The Progress 7K-TG spacecraft was the first generation Progress, derived from the Soyuz 7K-T and intended for uncrewed logistics missions to space stations in support of the Salyut programme. On some missions the spacecraft were also used to adjust the orbit of the space station.

The spacecraft were powered by chemical batteries, and could operate in free flight for up to three days, remaining docked to the station for up to thirty.

Launch
Progress 16 launched on 31 October 1982 from the Baikonur Cosmodrome in the Kazakh Soviet Socialist Republic. It used a Soyuz-U launch vehicle.

Docking
Progress 16 docked with the aft port of Salyut 7 on 2 November 1982 at 13:22 UTC, and was undocked on 13 December 1982 at 15:32 UTC.

Decay
It remained in orbit until 14 December 1982, when it was deorbited. The deorbit burn occurred at 17:17 UTC, with the mission ending around 18:00 UTC.

See also

 1982 in spaceflight
 List of Progress missions
 List of uncrewed spaceflights to Salyut space stations

References

Progress (spacecraft) missions
1982 in the Soviet Union
Spacecraft launched in 1982
Spacecraft which reentered in 1982
Spacecraft launched by Soyuz-U rockets